Bendigo Airport  is a public-use airport located in Dauphin County, Pennsylvania, United States. It is two miles (3 km) south of the central business district of Tower City in Schuylkill County. This airport is privately owned by Helen Bendigo.

Facilities 
 Runway 5/23: 2,325 x 60 ft (709 x 18 m), Surface: Asphalt/Concrete

References

External links 

Airports in Pennsylvania
Transportation buildings and structures in Schuylkill County, Pennsylvania